Kim Seung-youn (born February 7, 1952) is a South Korean businessman. He is currently the chairman of Hanwha Group. He was the former Head of the Bugil Education Foundation as well as that of Bugil Academy and Bugil Girls' Academy until 2014.

References 

1952 births
Living people
South Korean businesspeople